Peace in the Valley is an EP by American singer and musician Elvis Presley, released in April 1957 on RCA Victor Records in mono with catalogue number EPA 4054. It reached number three on the short-lived Billboard EP chart, number three on the album chart and  number 39 on the singles chart.

Background
By the 1950s, Presley's hometown of Memphis, Tennessee had become a center for gospel music in the United States. Presley grew up listening to this music, and maintained an abiding love for gospel singing his entire life. This EP initiated Presley's commercial presentation of this interest. Presley would go on to make many more recordings of spiritual music, including the issue of the gospel albums His Hand In Mine, How Great Thou Art, and He Touched Me, the latter two earning him Grammy Awards. A live recording of "How Great Thou Art" from the 1974 live album Elvis Recorded Live on Stage in Memphis would win Elvis a third Grammy.

Content
The recordings included on the EP were taken from sessions on January 12, 13, and 19 at Radio Recorders in Hollywood, California. All four selections are gospel classics, including two by Thomas A. Dorsey 'the father of black gospel'. The four songs are all reverential in spirit, rather than celebratory, uptempo gospel songs. Six months after the appearance of this EP, the four songs issued here would be added as bonus tracks to eight recordings of Christmas songs for his first holiday album.

Track listing

Personnel
The Blue Moon Boys

 Elvis Presley – lead vocals, acoustic guitar  
 Scotty Moore – electric guitar 
 Bill Black – double bass
 D. J. Fontana – drums 

The Jordanaires
 Gordon Stoker – piano on "Peace in the Valley", "I Believe" and "Take My Hand, Precious Lord", background vocals 
 Hoyt Hawkins – organ on "It Is No Secret", background vocals 
 Neal Matthews – background vocals 
 Hugh Jarrett – background vocals 

Additional personnel
 Dudley Brooks – piano on "It Is No Secret"

References

External links

Elvis Presley EPs
1957 EPs
Gospel EPs
Albums produced by Steve Sholes